Eucereon scyton is a moth of the subfamily Arctiinae first described by Pieter Cramer in 1777. It is found in Suriname and São Paulo, Brazil.

References

Moths described in 1777
scyton
Moths of South America
Fauna of Suriname